Plan Baton Rouge is a master plan for the redevelopment of the downtown of Baton Rouge, Louisiana.  The plan is based on New Urbanist principles.

History
In July 1998 during a week-long charrette, Plan Baton Rouge was first conceived as an idea by a group of town planners, architects, developers, property owners, elected officials, civic organizations, community groups, downtown workers, and residents.

Additional information
The plan has guided the growth that has been catalyzed by the State of Louisiana’s ambitious downtown building program.  Additionally, the Plan seeks to preserve and strengthen the two historic neighborhoods of Spanish Town and Beauregard Town.  It sets forth a strategy to restore the pedestrian character and sense of place of downtown for all of its citizens to enjoy.  The plan was developed by a well-renowned consultant team led by Duany Plater-Zyberk; the team focused on the physical design of downtown, the connections between the amenities, the transportation challenges and the retail dynamics.

The plan’s flexibility seeks to serve Baton Rouge far into the future as witnessed with the evolution of the Shaw Center project and the opportunity seized by the private sector.  Another initiative featured in the plan has already been realized with the creation of a public market, the Main Street Market, that has become a gathering place for the Baton Rouge community.

The plan identified areas where public action could leverage sustained private investment over time.  Since 1998, the state and other public agencies have poured $400 million into downtown and the private sector has responded with over $200 million. Plan Baton Rouge has been recognized nationally for its success in focusing citizens and public agencies on a common goal.

Downtown Baton Rouge's future
As the 104 proposals in the plan are implemented, Downtown Baton Rouge will resume its traditional role as the vital center of the Parish and the active Capitol of Louisiana.  Plan Baton Rouge will transform downtown into a 24-hour destination where residents and tourists will visit and recreate. More importantly, downtown will become a gathering place for the community.
Plan Baton Rouge was always envisioned as a model to be applied in other areas of the city using focused strategy to guide the growth and development of the area.  Plan Baton Rouge has joined its efforts with the Mayor’s Smart Growth Task Force to bring principles of good planning and Smart Growth to other areas of the city.  Plan Baton Rouge now has the opportunity to focus its efforts on another study area, Old South Baton Rouge. This is a natural extension of the Baton Rouge Area Foundation’s participation in on the Hope VI grant.

Related links
Center for Planning Excellence

Baton Rouge Area Foundation

Shaw Center for the Arts

Downtown Development District

Organizations based in Baton Rouge, Louisiana